The Sea Devils are a team of characters in comics published by DC Comics.  They are a team of conventional (non-superpowered) adventurers, in undersea adventures. They were created by writer Robert Kanigher and artist Russ Heath (through issue #10).

Fictional team biography
The team was introduced in Showcase #27 (July–August 1960) - #29 (November–December 1960). They then got their own title which lasted 35 issues (1961–67).

The team consisted of leader Dane Dorrance, Biff Bailey, Judy Walton (Dane's girlfriend), and Nicky Walton (Judy's younger brother). During a one issue crossover story with the Challengers of the Unknown in Challengers of the Unknown #51, they fight the criminal group known as Scorpio. 

The team also has affiliated allies called the International Sea Devils: Molo from Africa, Sikki from India, and Miguel from South America. They also sometimes team up with a magically cursed, green skinned amphibian man they called the Man-Fish (Juan Vallambrosa) and a group of diving students called the "Tadpoles".

More than ten years after the cancellation of their title, the team takes a small part in the defeat of an alien invasion in Showcase #100 (May 1978). Then, Dane and Judy (now married) help out Christopher Chance, the Human Target in Detective Comics #486 (October–November 1979).

The Sea Devils (usually only Dane) later appear as part of the Forgotten Heroes team. Dane has also works away from the other Devils when he forms a new team to protect dolphin migration from human killers.

They help in another alien invasion, this time by the Apellaxians. They assist in entrapping a group of 'Mercury' aliens, assisted by Aquaman and Cave Carson. This is set chronologically early in their career.

The Sea Devils resurface in Aquaman: Sword of Atlantis #42 as the de facto paramilitary guardians of Windward Home. Jim Lockhart the Red Torpedo, and Elsa Magnusson, widow of Mark Merlin, are the administrators of Windward. The Sea Devils briefly appeared in Grant Morrison's Final Crisis, where they were shown aiding an alternate-universe version of Aquaman in his battle against Ocean Master. The Sea Devils made their most recent appearance in the finale of Justice League: Cry For Justice, where they are shown assisting Wally West and Jay Garrick in defusing a massive underwater explosive device planted by Prometheus.

In The New 52 reboot of DC's continuity, the Sea Devils (composed of Dane Dorrance and Nick and Judy Walton) appear as "eco-terrorists" but remain close allies of Aquaman.

Other versions

Convergence
During the Convergence, Dan Dorrance has become the director of S.T.A.R. Labs in Metropolis. When the city is overtaken by an alien dome and the harbor is polluted, Dorrance supervises Aquaman moving in STAR Labs for his aquatic needs. At first, Aquaman doesn't trust the Dorrance's people. However, a year later, the force beyond the dome sends a near-immortal killing machine named Deathblow after Aquaman. Dorrance and his employees fight alongside Aquaman, subduing the threat. Many of Dorrance's people die. This cements Aquaman's loyalty, forgiving all past disputes.

Tangent
The nine Tangent Comics titles published by DC Comics in 1997 include a Sea Devils title written by Kurt Busiek. In this universe, the Sea Devils are fish mutated into sentient humanoids by the radiation of an atomic exchange between the United States and Cuba, which destroyed most of Florida and Georgia. The Sea Devils' city of Shaligo is built on the remains of Macon, Georgia, and is ruled by a charismatic red-skinned Sea Devil known as the Ocean Master.

Flashpoint
In the events of Flashpoint, the Sea Devils was a government-sponsored American combat group under the leadership of Dane Dorrance sent to apprehend the foreign invader Booster Gold, who had unknowingly found himself in their alternate timeline.

The New Frontier

The Sea Devils make two cameo appearances in Darwyn Cooke's DC: The New Frontier miniseries, first in a montage of adventurers and heroes traveling to fight the antagonist, and then helping rescue pilots who are shot down over the ocean.

References

External links
Sea Devils at Don Markstein's Toonopedia. Archived from the original on March 29, 2017.
DCU Guide: Sea Devils
Sea Devils index

Comics characters introduced in 1960
Characters created by Robert Kanigher
DC Comics characters
DC Comics titles
Defunct American comics